Mapes Creek is a stream in the Rainier Beach neighborhood of Seattle, Washington, United States. It runs through Kubota Garden and Beer Sheva Park on its way to Lake Washington.

Rivers of Washington (state)
Landforms of Seattle
Rivers of King County, Washington
Rainier Beach, Seattle